The Country Innocence; Or, The Chamber-maid Turn'd Quaker is a 1677 comedy play by the English writer John Leanerd. It was originally performed by the King's Company at the Theatre Royal, Drury Lane in London. It borrowed very heavily from the 1647 work The Countrie Girl by Thomas Brewer.

The first cast included Edward Lydall as  Sir Oliver Bellingham, John Coysh as Sir Robert Malory, Cardell Goodman as Captain Mullineux, John Wiltshire as Plush, Philip Griffin as Rash, Joseph Haines as Gregory Dwindle, Martin Powell as Mr William, Marmaduke Watson as  Old Thrashard, Carey Perin as Old Gentlewoman, Rebecca Marshall as Lady Lovely, Sarah Cooke as  Gillian and Mary Knep as Barbara.

References

Bibliography
 Konigsberg, Ira. Samuel Richardson and the Dramatic Novel. University Press of Kentucky, 2014.
 Van Lennep, W. The London Stage, 1660-1800: Volume One, 1660-1700. Southern Illinois University Press, 1960.

1677 plays
West End plays
Plays by John Leanerd
Restoration comedy